Gardenia ovularis is a small tree in the family Rubiaceae. It is endemic to a very restricted part of north east Queensland, namely the coastal rainforests from the Bloomfield River southwards to Etty Bay, and with a further isolated occurrence at Mount Elliot, south of Townsville It was first described by Frederick Manson Bailey in 1893.

Conservation
This species is listed by the Queensland Department of Environment and Science as least concern. , it has not been assessed by the IUCN.

References

External links
 
 
 View a map of historical sightings of this species at the Australasian Virtual Herbarium
 View observations of this species on iNaturalist
 View images of this species on Flickriver

ovularis
Endemic flora of Queensland
Taxa named by Frederick Manson Bailey
Plants described in 1893